The Incident may refer to:

History 
 The Incident (conspiracy), an event in British history

Films 
 The Incident (1967 film), a 1967 film starring Beau Bridges and Martin Sheen
 The Incident (1978 film), a Japanese film by Yoshitaro Nomura
 The Incident (1990 film), a 1990 film starring Walter Matthau and Harry Morgan
 The Incident (2011 film), a 2011 French film
 The Incident (2014 film), a 2014 Mexican film

TV shows 
 "The Incident" (Lost)
 "The Incident" (Modern Family)

Music 
 The Incident (album), a 2009 album by Porcupine Tree
 "The Incident", a song by Michelle Williams from the album Do You Know, 2004

Poetry 
 "The Incident", a 1925 poem by Countee Cullen

Videogames 
 The Incident (video game), a 2010 video game for iOS and Mac OS X

See also
 Incident (disambiguation)